They Came from Beyond Space is a 1967 British Eastman Color science fiction film produced by Max J. Rosenberg and Milton Subotsky, and directed by Freddie Francis. The screenplay was written by Subotsky, based on the 1941 novel The Gods Hate Kansas by Joseph Millard. The film stars Robert Hutton, Jennifer Jayne, Zia Mohyeddin and Bernard Kay. The narrative follows the adventures of a scientist who tries to stop space aliens who are made of pure energy from enslaving humans in order to rebuild their spaceship so that they can return to their home planet.

The film is from Amicus Productions who released the film as a double bill with The Terrornauts. They Came from Beyond Space used many of the sets and props left over from Amicus's Daleks' Invasion Earth 2150 A.D. (1966) as a cost-cutting measure.

Plot summary 
An unusual V-shaped formation of meteorites has fallen in Cornwall. A group of scientists are appointed to investigate, but its head, Dr. Curtis Temple (Hutton), is forbidden by his physician from going as Curtis is recovering from an automobile accident and has a silver plate in his skull. He turns the mission over to Lee Mason (Jayne), his colleague and lover.

When the scientists arrive at the site, they find the meteorites to be unusual in shape and colour—they're rather pointy and blue. And they house aliens who exist as 'pure energy'. A geologist attempts to chisel off a piece of meteorite, but as soon as he strikes it, it emits a blinding flash of light and a high-pitched screech as the aliens take over the scientists' bodies and minds.

Concerned that the only contact with Lee has been her requisitions for millions of pounds' worth of equipment—including weapons—Curtis decides to visit the site despite his MD's orders. But before he leaves, a fellow scientist (Geoffrey Wallace) determines that the meteorites have, surprisingly, come from the moon.

Upon arrival, Curtis finds that the site resembles a military post, with armed guards and a 10,000-volt electric security fence. Lee herself bars him from entering.

An agent from 'Internal Security' has been tailing Curtis but must phone his superior for permission to give Curtis a full situation report. He enters a phone box to place the call, then suddenly stumbles out, covered with red spots, and falls dying to the ground. A small crowd gathers. A doctor steps forward, but after touching the agent, he too dies. Then each member of the crowd succumbs. The press dramatically dubs this unknown disease 'The Crimson Plague'. A television commentator assures viewers that although no cause or cure has been discovered, the authorities have developed a secret method of safely disposing of the victims' bodies.

After watching a night-time rocket launch from the site, Curtis decides to prevent another launch. A crack shot, he returns the next day with a sniper rifle and destroys the generator that supplies power to the camp, thus stopping the second launch. He climbs over the now-deactivated electric fence into the site.

After entering the aliens' headquarters, Curtis, who is also an expert in unarmed combat, wins a violent fight with one of them. He goes to a vast underground complex. There, he discovers the frozen bodies of the plague victims. But he is captured and locked in a cell. Curtis escapes by simply hiding behind his cell door and jumping the alien (Kay) who comes to kill him. Curtis then rescues an unwilling Lee, knocking her out with a swift punch to the jaw and carrying her off.

He takes her to the home of his friend Farge (Mohyeddin). Curtis realises that the silver plate in his head somehow prevents the aliens from possessing him. He convinces Farge to melt his beloved silver cricket trophies and then fashions a colander-like protective helmet for him.

Farge uses ultraviolet light to exorcise Lee's alien. Unfortunately, she remembers nothing from her time under alien control. But she can pretend that she is still an alien and drives to the site with Curtis and Farge hiding in the back of her Land Rover. Lee, too, is protected by a silver helmet.

The three conceal themselves in a rocket just before it blasts off. But they're soon discovered and brought before the Master of the Moon (Michael Gough), who tells them that the government's secret plan to dispose of the plague victims' bodies is to shoot them to the moon.

The Master explains to Curtis, Lee and Farge that the aliens are creatures of pure energy and are using the humans to repair their spaceship, which had crashed on the moon. They want to return to their home planet to die, as they have grown old and tired after light years of travel. The frozen bodies Curtis had found are not really dead. The Master assures them that once the spaceship is repaired, all the 'victims' will be returned to normality.

Nonetheless, the aliens prepare to surgically remove Curtis's silver plate so that they can tap his knowledge. Farge leads the workers in a revolt and saves Curtis.

Curtis tells the Master of the Moon that they needn't have attempted to conquer the Earth—all they had to do was ask for help, and it would have gladly been given. The Master's eyes well up with tears at the revelation.

Cast 
 Robert Hutton as Dr. Curtis Temple
 Jennifer Jayne as Lee Mason
 Zia Mohyeddin as Farge
 Bernard Kay as Richard Arden
 Michael Gough as Master of the Moon (Arnold Gray)
 Geoffrey Wallace as Alan Mullane
 Maurice Good as Agent Stillwell
 Luanshya Greer as Female Petrol Station Attendant
 John Harvey as Bill Trethowan
 Diana King as Mrs. Trethowan
 Paul Bacon as Dr. Rogers
 Christopher Banks as Doctor on Street
 Dermot Cathie as Peterson
 Norman Claridge as Dr. Frederick Andrews
 James Donnelly as Farm Gate Guard
 Frank Forsyth as Mr. Blake
 Leonard Grahame as McCabe
 Michael Hawkins as Williams
 Jack Lambert as Doctor in Office
 Robin Parkinson as Dr. Maitland
 Edward Rees as Bank Manager
 Katy Wild as Girl in Street
 Kenneth Kendall as TV Commentator

Production 
They Came from Beyond Space was made by Amicus Productions at Twickenham Studios. Much of the exterior action was filmed on Cookham High Street, in Cookham, Berkshire, UK.

The film was granted an A-Certificate by the British Board of Film Censors on 30 March 1967. The A-Cert signified that the film was 'more suitable' for adult audiences. However, in order to receive the A-Cert, the movie had to be cut from its original running time of about 85 minutes to approximately 83 minutes. Details of the required cuts are not known.

The film's running time in the U.S. is the full 85 minutes. It carries no rating as it was released not long before the MPAA film ratings system went into effect on 1 November 1968.

Distribution 
They Came from Beyond Space was distributed to theatres in the U.S. by Embassy Pictures during 'Summer 1967' although neither BoxOffice nor Variety reviewed the film until October of that year.

Director Freddie Francis said in an interview that the producers had spent all their budget on The Terrornauts so there was no money left over for They Came from Beyond Space. The double feature failed at the box office and has been described as the "two worst films the company ever produced".

StudioCanal released a video of the film in the UK in 2012 with a PG rating from the BBFC. The rating means that the video is acceptable 'for general viewing but some scenes may be unsuitable for young children'. Its running time is approximately 82 minutes, about a minute shorter than the UK theatrical release.

VNF released a DVD of They Came from Beyond Space in the U.S. in January 2017.

Reception 
BoxOffice magazine's standing feature 'Review Digest' in the 6 May 1968 edition provides ratings that fall on the lower end of the scale. Only three of the usual seven publications that BoxOffice tracks reviewed the film, with BoxOffice itself rating the film as 'good'; Variety as 'poor'; and the New York Daily News as 'very poor'. The anonymous BoxOffice reviewer in the magazine's issue of 23 October 1967 calls the film 'a science-fiction programmer made-to-order for the kiddies and action-minded males'. The generally positive review points out that its 'ingenious sets' and 'fine colour photography by Norman Warwick rate special mention'. The review also notes that 'the attractive Jennifer Jayne and that fine young character actor Zia Moyheddin stand out in the capable cast'.

Taste of Cinema writer David Harkin suggested that "They Came from Beyond Space is a very enjoyable, if ridiculous, film. There is ace scientist Dr Curtis Temple, who moonlights as a commando, space measles, and a curious scene where Lee Mason (Jennifer Jayne), one of the brainwashed scientists controlled by the alien race, visits the local bank to secure a bank loan" 

Variety review, written by the pseudonymous 'Robe' for the issue of 11 October 1967, is more negative. It says that the film is a 'tired tale' with such 'abysmal colour photography' that it 'might as well as have been made in black and white'. It also mentions that 'What is disappointing in this particular effort, as much as its obvious plot, is the lack of special effects of any importance'. But it singles out the main actors as 'being very good within the confines of their limited parts'.

British critic Phil Hardy also dislikes They Came from Beyond Space, calling it an 'inferior piece of Science Fiction'. However, he points out in his brief review that 'The leaden script and erratic directing notwithstanding, the film is of interest for its optimistic ending'.

British academic film historian Steve Chibnall in the book British Science Fiction Cinema notes that the movie is 'fuelled by the same paranoia as the American Invasion of the Body Snatchers [1956], but in turning its fifties pessimism into simplistic sixties optimism it manages to squander any claims to cultural relevance'. He calls the script 'tired' and notes that 'with more imagination and wit' it 'might have been salvaged as an episode of The Avengers'.

David Elroy Goldwater, an American critic, is not a fan of the movie, either. He writes that it has a 'lack of imperative, a lack of purpose. The stakes are low. It's unoriginal and unimaginative, with the same old emotionless robotic aliens we have seen 100 times'. Goldwater also notes that the silver helmet worn by Farge to protect himself from alien possession is 'unconsciously campy' and looks 'obviously like a spaghetti strainer'.

Viewers who contribute voluntary rankings of films to various websites are generally unimpressed with They Came from Beyond Space. The 1,245 viewers who ranked the film at IMDb give it a score of 4.5 out of 10. A score of 2.43 of 5, based on 733 'votes', is recorded at Rotten Tomatoes. The 33 rankers at Letterboxd give it a similar score of 2.4 of 5, while a low 1.5 of 5 is the result of five votes at AllMovie. And Rate Your Music gives the film 2.37 of 5, based on 31 user ratings, and ranks it as the 392nd-most-popular movie of 1967.

References

External links 
 
 
 
 
 Curiosities - The Gods Hate Kansas by Bud Webster at F&SF

1967 films
1960s science fiction horror films
Films based on American novels
Films based on science fiction novels
Films directed by Freddie Francis
Amicus Productions films
British science fiction films
1967 horror films
Embassy Pictures films
1960s English-language films
1960s British films